T. Vikraman is an Indian politician and member of the Bharatiya Janata Party. He is Nominated as a Member of Legislative Assembly (MLA) to the Puducherry Legislative Assembly from January 29, 2021 by the Government of India. He has nominated to the Legislative Assembly after the death of K. G. Shankar.

References 

Bharatiya Janata Party politicians from Puducherry
Puducherry MLAs 2021–2026
Living people
Puducherry politicians
Year of birth missing (living people)
Nominated members of the Puducherry Legislative Assembly